Terellia nigripalpis is a species of tephritid or fruit flies in the genus Terellia of the family Tephritidae.

Distribution
Turkey.

References

Tephritinae
Insects described in 1927
Diptera of Asia